The  were kings of ancient Japan who sent envoys to China during the 5th century to strengthen the legitimacy of their claims to power by gaining the recognition of the Chinese emperor. Details about them are unknown. According to written records in China, their names were San, Chin, Sai, Kō and Bu.

Titles bestowed on the Kings of Wa 
In general, five kings of Wa were bestowed the titles  (Antō Dai-Shōgun, Wa-kokuō, Grand General of Antō, King of Wa). In the Southern Dynasties of China in this period, there were three ranks of General titles which were bestowed to the chiefs of the subject state (located in the East of China) who sent envoy to the emperor of the Dynasty.

However, the Song Emperor bestowed the third general title,  (Grand General pacifying the East) on the King of Wa. There are interpretations on this fact that the King of Goguryeo stood in the highest rank, and the King of Wa stood in the lowest rank, while the King of Baekje stood between Goguryeo and Wa. But there are also other opinions against this interpretation. The difference of general ranks among the three states (Goguryo, Baekje, and Wa) was due to the order which each state had first sent envoy to the dynasty, and it cannot be said that the ranks of Goguryeo and Baekje were substantially higher than that of Wa. Sakamoto also points out the different view on these general titles.

Chinese records and the bestowed titles on the kings of Wa

Comparison with the Nihon Shoki

As the name of kings recorded in Chinese history are very different from the names of Emperors in the Nihon Shoki, the specification of which emperor was the one recorded is the subject of numerous disputes which have endured for centuries. Most contemporary historians assign the five Japanese kings to the following emperors (two possibilities are identified for the Kings San and Chin), mostly based on the individual features of their genealogies reported in the Chinese sources.

On the other hand, archeological evidence, such as the  inscriptions on the Inariyama and Eta Funayama Sword, also supports the idea that Bu is an equivalent of Emperor Yūryaku, who was called Wakatakeru Ōkimi by his contemporaries.

San  : Emperor Nintoku or Emperor Richū
Chin : Emperor Hanzei or Emperor Nintoku
Sai  : Emperor Ingyō
Kō   : Emperor Ankō
Bu   : Emperor Yūryaku

Since Bu is most likely to be Yūryaku, Kō, who is said to be Bu's older brother, is likely to be an equivalent of Ankō, who is also noted in the Nihonshoki as an elder brother to Yūryaku. However, the Book of Song records Kō as "Crown Prince Kō"; there is a possibility that he is not Ankō, but rather Prince Kinashi no Karu, who was a crown prince of Ingyō.

Meanings of titles bestowed on the kings of Wa 
In the age of the Song Dynasty and the Southern Dynasties, there were various titles for high officials and military lords of the empire. These titles were also bestowed on the Monarch of the subject States in the Sakuhō System.

King of Wa was generally bestowed the two titles, "(Grand) General Antō" (Antō (Dai) Shōgun) and "King of Wa" (Wa-Kokuō). Some Kings of Wa, such as King Chin or King Bu, asked the more strong and higher rank Titles. The Emperor of Chinese Dynasty bestowed some of them, but not approved every titles required.

King Chin asked the titles ”" (Shijisetsu, Totoku, Wa, Baekje, Silla, Mimana, Shinkan, Bokan, Rokkoku-Shogunji, Antō-Shōgun, Wa-Kokuō). This contains the Five Titles.
 , Shijisetsu : Highest Rank Military Commander (General)
 , Totoku : Military Governor
 , Totoku - Region - Shogunji : Governor/Commander ruling all the military matters of the said Region (Region, State, Province, etc.)
 , Antō Dai-Shōgun : Grand General of Antō (Grand General pacifying the East)
 , Wa-Kokuō : King of Wa State
Therefore, ”" means 1) Highest Rank Military General, 2) Governor ruling all the military matters of the Six States - Wa, Baekje, Silla, Mimana, Shinkan and Bokan, 3) Grand General pacifying the East, 4) King of Wa. The Song dynasty did not approve that King Chin would hold the power of militarily ruling the State area of Baekje. (King Bu also asked this power - militarily ruling the Baekje State -, but the Song did no approve as well.)

King Bu asked the Title  (Kaifu Gidō-Sanshi), but the Emperor of Song dynasty did not approve, and instead bestowed the Titles "" (Shijisetsu, Totoku, Wa, Silla, Mimana, Kara, Shinkan, Bokan, Rokkoku-Shogunji, Antō-Shōgun, Wa-Kokuō). The Title Kaifu Gidō-Sanshi is very high Rank title.
  Kaifu Gidō-Sanshi : Person whose Position is equivalent or corresponds to the "Three Lords" (Highest Ranking Officials in the old Imperial Chinese governments. That is,  Jōshō (Shito),  Taii,  Gyoshi-Taifu (Shikū)

See also

Kofun Period
 Wakoku
 Dynasty replacement theory
 Kawachi dynasty
 Harima dynasty
 Echizen dynasty

Notes

References

External links
 石井正敏 (2005年6月). (ja) “5世紀の日韓関係 - 倭の五王と高句麗・百済 -”. 日韓歴史共同研究報告書（第1期） (日韓歴史共同研究). オリジナルの2015年10月18日時点におけるアーカイブ。

Kofun period
Yamatai
Five kings of Wa